Khong-e Bala (also Romanized as Khong-e Bālā and Khūng-e Bālā; also known as Khong, Khung, Khūnīk, and Khurg) is a village in Baqeran Rural District, in the Central District of Birjand County, South Khorasan Province, Iran. At the 2006 census, its population was 126, in 52 families.

References 

Populated places in Birjand County